The third cabinet of Per Albin Hansson was the cabinet of Sweden between 13 December 1939 and 31 July 1945. It consisted of members from the Social Democratic Party, the Farmers' League, the People's Party and the National Organization of the Right. It was a national unity government formed for reasons of national stability during World War II, and its constituent parties represented 219 out of the 230 seats in the Parliament of Sweden since the 1936 general election. Two parties of the 1936–1940 parliament were kept out of the government, the pro-Soviet Communist Party and the Socialist Party, which veered between Communist and Nazi positions, and lost its parliamentary representation in 1940. After the 1940 general election, the government represented 227 out of the 230 seats in parliament, and after 1944 general election, 215 out of 230.

After the end of World War II, the coalition government was dissolved on 31 July 1945, and was replaced by a government consisting only of social democrat ministers, as this party held 115 out of 230 seats in parliament.

Ministers

|}

References

External links

1939 establishments in Sweden
Cabinets of Sweden
Politics of Sweden
1945 disestablishments in Sweden
Cabinets established in 1939
Cabinets disestablished in 1945